Jean-Baptiste Bordas (born 8 January 1938) is a French former footballer. He competed in the men's tournament at the 1960 Summer Olympics.

References

External links
 

1938 births
Living people
French footballers
Olympic footballers of France
Footballers at the 1960 Summer Olympics
Footballers from Orléans
Association football midfielders
AS Saint-Étienne players
Le Havre AC players
US Orléans players